Boleslaus I (915  – 972), a member of the Přemyslid dynasty, was ruler (kníže, "duke") of the Duchy of Bohemia from 935 to his death. He is notorious for the murder of his elder brother Wenceslaus, through which he became duke. 

Despite his complicity in this fratricide, Boleslaus is generally respected by Czech historians as an energetic ruler who significantly strengthened the Bohemian state and expanded its territory. His accomplishments include significant economic development due to an expansion in trade, the introduction of silver mining and the minting of the first local coinage, the Prague denarius.

Early life

Boleslaus was the son of Duke Vratislaus I of Bohemia (d. 921) by his marriage with Drahomíra (d. 934), probably a Hevellian princess. His father took over the rule in Prague around the time of Boleslav's birth, during which he had to deal with both the exertion of influence by the East Frankish dukes of Bavaria and Saxony and the Magyar incursions.

Boleslaus and his elder brother Wenceslaus were taught the Christian faith and to read the Psalms by their grandmother Ludmila. There is evidence that Boleslaus's pagan mother might have influenced him against his brother and Christianity, though he later repented. In no way did he impede the growth of Christianity during his reign in Bohemia, and, in fact, he actually sent his daughter Mlada, a nun, to Pope John XIII in Rome to ask permission to make Prague a bishopric.

Upon his death, Vratislaus was succeeded by his eldest son Wenceslaus. While the external situation worsened with the alliance between Duke Arnulf of Bavaria and the Saxon duke Henry the Fowler, King of East Francia from 919, Wenceslaus could only maintain his independence by entering an agreement to pay an annual tribute to the East Frankish (German) ruler. Shortly afterwards, in 935 (or in 929, according to other sources), Wenceslaus was murdered at Stará Boleslav after accepting an invitation from Boleslaus to celebrate the feast of Saints Cosmas and Damian with him there. According to tradition, a son of Boleslaus was born at exactly the same time. The child was given the strange name "Strachkvas", which means "a dreadful feast". Remorseful for what he had done, Boleslaus promised to have his son educated as a clergyman and devote his life to religion.

Reign
After having taken over the Prague throne, one of Boleslaus's major concerns was the tribute paid yearly to the East Frankish kings as stipulated in the peace treaty that Henry the Fowler had established with Boleslaus's brother Wenceslaus. He stopped the payment shortly after he ascended the throne, which led to a prolonged war with Henry's successor King Otto. In 935, Boleslaus attacked the Thuringian allies of the Saxons in the northwest and defeated two of Otto's armies (from Thuringia and Merseburg). The war then deteriorated to border raids (the general pattern of warfare in this region at the time) and reached its conclusion in 950, when King Otto besieged a castle owned by Boleslaus's son. This prompted Boleslaus to sign a peace treaty with Otto. Although he remained undefeated, he promised to resume the payment of tribute.

Five years later, the armies of the Czechs and Germans allied against the Magyars in the victorious Battle of Lechfeld on 10 August 955. After the battle, the remainder of the huge Magyar army turned to Bohemia, where it was crushed by Boleslaus. Shortly afterwards, in October, he also helped Otto to crush an uprising of Slavic tribes led by the Obotrite princes Nakon and Stojgněv on the Lower Elbe river in the Battle on the Raxa.

The defeat of invading Hungarians brought the same benefits to both Germans and Czechs. Less obvious is what Boleslaus expected to gain from his participation in Otto's war against the Obotrite princes in the far north. He probably wanted to ensure that his powerful German neighbors did not interfere with him in expanding the Bohemian territories to the east.
As a result of the victory, Boleslaus freed the Moravian lands from Magyar raids and expanded his territory, which in turn was later conquered by Polish dukes and became known as Upper Silesia and Lesser Poland. By occupying the city of Kraków, he controlled important trade routes from Prague to Kiev and Lviv. To defuse the Bohemian-Polish conflict, Duke Boleslav married his daughter Doubravka to the pagan Piast prince Mieszko I in 963/964, and helped bring Christianity to Poland. He even allied with Mieszko in the campaign against the Saxon count Wichmann the Younger.

According to the medieval chronicler Cosmas of Prague, Duke Boleslaus died on 15 July 967, a date questioned by recent research. He was succeeded by his eldest son Boleslaus the Pious.

Marriage and children
Boleslav's wife may have been Biagota. It is unknown if she was the mother of all four of his adult children:
 Doubravka of Bohemia,
 Boleslaus II, Duke of Bohemia,
 Strachkvas of Bohemia,
 Mlada of Bohemia.

Sources
 Ancestral Roots of Certain American Colonists Who Came to America Before 1700 by Frederick Lewis Weis; Line 244-7
 The Plantagenet Ancestry by William Henry Turton, Page 85

Dukes of Bohemia
Christian monarchs
Czech military leaders
Czech murderers
10th-century births
10th-century deaths
10th-century Bohemian people
10th-century rulers in Europe
Place of birth unknown
Place of death unknown
Year of birth uncertain
Year of death uncertain